is a multi-purpose stadium in Kōfu, Yamanashi Prefecture, Japan.  It is currently used mostly for football matches. It serves as a home ground of Ventforet Kofu. The stadium holds 17,000 people and was built in 1985.

It is also used sometimes for Top League rugby union games and frequently for high school athletics events.

It was formerly known as Kose Sports Park Stadium. Since March 2011 it has been called Yamanashi Chuo Bank Stadium for the naming rights.

External links 

 

Football venues in Japan
Athletics (track and field) venues in Japan
Rugby union stadiums in Japan
Multi-purpose stadiums in Japan
Sports venues in Yamanashi Prefecture
Ventforet Kofu
Kōfu, Yamanashi
Sports venues completed in 1985
1985 establishments in Japan